Premier Cruise Line, a subsidiary of Premier Cruises, was a cruise line that was headquartered in Cape Canaveral, Florida. From 1985 to 1993, it was licensed as the official cruise line of Walt Disney World and used the trademark "The Big Red Boat" based on the color scheme of some of its ships. Dolphin Cruise Line, a company that became a part of Premier, was headquartered on Dodge Island in Miami.

Company history

Premier Cruise Line was formed in 1983 by A.E. "Ed" Merhige (Florida Export Warehouse/International Cruise Shops) and Bruce Nierenberg (NCL), two cruise veterans and later bought by Dial Corporation (of Dial soap fame), which then also owned the Greyhound Bus Company. The ships typically operated three- and four-day Bahamas trips out of Port Canaveral, Florida. The company earned over $20 million annually on a gross revenue of $100 million during the 1980s. The successful niche that Premier served was the family cruise line, especially attractive to grandparents sailing with their children and grandchildren.

Starting in 1985, Premier partnered with Walt Disney World, providing seven-night land and sea vacations on The Big Red Boat. Premier was licensed to provide Disney characters on its ships, until the relationship ended in 1993. Disney then proceeded to start its own cruise ship line in 1995.

After the Disney contract ended, Premier then affiliated itself with Warner Bros.' Looney Tunes characters to maintain its family-friendly image, and was returned to profitability under the direction of 20-year cruise veteran Jim Naik.   The company had an aging fleet of Italian-designed ships competing with newer and larger liners. Mr. Naik brought Premier to profitability in his first quarter with the company.  Premier's parent company, Dial, sold the company after posting profits for 1995, 1996, and 1997. New owners and new leadership followed, with Larry Magnan as president in 1998. However, the company would file for bankruptcy and cease all operations on September 14, 2000, with passengers on the still-running cruises being docked and given flights home on a first-come, first-served basis; the company's primary lender had seized its existing fleet, which had been put up for collateral.

The older ships were designed before the current disability acts coming into effect, requiring reasonable access for persons with physical disabilities, were even envisioned, let alone enacted into law.  Much later, after 1997, Premier was sued under the Americans with Disabilities Act (passed in 1990) for not making accommodations for people with disabilities. Premier ships included the Majestic (the former Sun Princess of Princess Cruise Lines), the former Home Lines flagship Oceanic, the Atlantic (another former Home Lines ship), and the Royale, a former Costa Cruises liner known then as the Frederico C. The original four ships had the prefix "Star/Ship" before their names. During Premier's reorganization in the mid 1990s all but the Oceanic (Big Red Boat I) were sold off. Premier then became an amalgamation of Dolphin and Seawind Cruises. Later, the Rembrandt, formerly the Rotterdam of Holland America Lines, was added to the line.

The SS Oceanic (Big Red Boat I) was still sailing until 2012 when she was sailed to Yokohama for scrapping. The Big Red Boat II, formerly Eugenio Costa, was put up for sale and was laid up in Freeport, Bahamas. She had no potential buyers and remained there until 2005, eventually being sold to the breakers and was scrapped in Alang, India in late 2005. The Big Red Boat III, formerly Carnival Cruise Line's Festivale, was also sold for scrap. Lastly, the Rembrandt, formerly the Rotterdam, was purchased by the city of Rotterdam, The Netherlands to be restored and kept as a historic landmark.

Former fleet

Timeline

References

External links

 Archive of Premiercruises.com

Transport companies established in 1983
Transport companies disestablished in 2000
Defunct companies based in Florida
Defunct cruise lines
Defunct shipping companies of the United States
1983 establishments in Florida
2000 disestablishments in Florida